Dalea humifusa is a species of plant in the family Fabaceae. It is found only in Ecuador. Its natural habitat is subtropical or tropical dry shrubland.

References

humifusa
Endemic flora of Ecuador
Near threatened plants
Taxonomy articles created by Polbot